Alexander Fraser (1710–1751) was the 14th Lord Saltoun.

1710 births
1751 deaths
Lords Saltoun